The 2010–11 season was Blackpool F.C.s debut season in the Premier League, after winning the 2009–10 Championship play-off Final in what was their 99th consecutive season in the Football League. It was also their 28th overall season in English football's top tier, but their first since 1971. It was Ian Holloway's second season as manager. The club finished 19th and were relegated back to the Championship.

Season summary
The talk during the build-up to the new season was mainly centred around the club's lack of activity in the transfer market. Indeed, 81 days passed between the play-off final and the first arrivals at Bloomfield Road for the forthcoming season. After the release of five players, plus the sale of Ben Burgess to Notts County and the forced retirement of Stephen McPhee, coupled with the departure of the five loan players who finished the 2009–10 campaign at the club, Ian Holloway had just fifteen senior players at his disposal. On 11 August, however, the club replaced those five players with a quintet of new faces. A sixth, Chris Basham from Bolton Wanderers, followed two days later. On 13 August, the eve of the new term, Blackpool had a first-team squad of 26; however, the advent of a new Premier League rule meant that, between 1 September and 1 January, the maximum number of players a club could pick from for Premier League games was 25. Eight of these must have been home-grown players. According to the Premier League: "A home-grown player means a player who, irrespective of his nationality or age, has been registered with any club affiliated to the Football Association or the Football Association of Wales for a period, continuous or not, of three entire seasons or 36 months prior to his 21st birthday (or the end of the Season during which he turns 21)." On 1 February, clubs named another 25-man squad to see them through to the end of the Premier League season.

On 18 August, Israeli international centre-back Dekel Keinan was finally able to complete a deal that was set up earlier in the close season, after receiving his work permit. He arrived on a free transfer. He left the club in the January transfer window, however, for Cardiff City.

Several players, including Gary Taylor-Fletcher, Jason Euell and Charlie Adam, kept the squad number assigned to them for the 2009–10 season despite their number not falling inside the traditional 1 to 11. Paul Rachubka retained the number 1 shirt despite being second choice to Matthew Gilks the previous campaign and the start of the new one.

On 1 September, the club submitted their squad (of 24, not the maximum 25) to the Premier League.

Pre-season
In July, Blackpool partook in the pre-season South West Challenge Cup, in Devon, and won the competition.

Season proper

Following an opening-day 4–0 win over Wigan Athletic at the DW Stadium on 14 August, a result that briefly put them top of the entire English football pyramid for the first time since the opening day of the 1957–58 season, Blackpool earned the League Managers Association's "Performance of the Week Award".

Seven days later, they suffered their first defeat, 6–0 at Arsenal. Theo Walcott opened the scoring on twelve minutes. Just after the half-hour mark, Ian Evatt brought down Marouane Chamakh inches outside the penalty area, but the referee, Mike Jones, awarded a penalty and dismissed the Blackpool defender. Andrei Arshavin doubled the Gunners lead from the spot. Walcott netted his second of the half to make it 3–0 at the break. Abou Diaby made it 4–0 four minutes after the restart, and Walcott completed his hat-trick inside an hour. Chamakh completed the scoring with seven minutes remaining. The result saw Blackpool drop to tenth place in the table.

On 24 August, Blackpool were knocked out of the League Cup in the second round by MK Dons.

Three days later, Luke Varney joined Blackpool on a season-long loan from Derby County, with a view to a permanent deal. Varney scored on his debut in the following day's fixture: a 2–2 draw with Fulham at Bloomfield Road, in what was the first-ever Premier League game played at the ground.

As the first transfer window of the season came to a close, four players were added to the squad. On deadline day itself, Matt Phillips arrived from Wycombe Wanderers for a £325,000 fee. The same day, the club tied-up the deal that had been hinted at since the end of the previous campaign. DJ Campbell, whose hat-trick in the second leg of the play-off semi-final against Nottingham Forest helped put Blackpool in the final, was signed on a permanent basis after his two loan spells during the 2009–10 campaign. On 1 September, the Seasiders also finalised deals with Australian midfielder David Carney and Ghanaian goalkeeper Richard Kingson, giving Ian Holloway thirty available players to work with until January.

After a two-week international break, Blackpool returned to Premier League duty on 11 September with a visit to Newcastle United. A penalty from Charlie Adam just before half-time was the difference until DJ Campbell, with his first goal as a permanent Blackpool player, scored in injury time to seal the Tangerines second Premier League victory in four games. The result put them fourth in the table, behind Chelsea, Arsenal and Manchester United.

Eight days later, they made their second trip to the capital in a month, where they faced Chelsea. Salomon Kalou opened the scoring for the hosts inside two minutes, and ten minutes later Florent Malouda doubled the lead. Didier Drogba made it 3–0 on the half-hour, before Malouda netted his second four minutes before the break to complete the scoring.

On 25 September, Blackpool faced Blackburn Rovers at Bloomfield Road in only their second home Premier League game of the opening six. The fixture saw Blackburn manager Sam Allardyce's first return to the club since his sacking fourteen years earlier. Charlie Adam gave Rovers the lead with an own-goal after twenty minutes, and that is how the score remained until the 85th, when Matt Phillips equalised one minute after coming on as substitute for Neal Eardley. Brett Emerton scored the winner for Rovers three minutes into injury time.

Eight days later, Blackpool faced Liverpool at Anfield for the first time in a league game since 9 January 1971. Charlie Adam put the visitors ahead with a 29th-minute penalty after Luke Varney was felled by Glen Johnson. It was Varney himself who doubled Blackpool's lead in first-half injury time. Sotirios Kyrgiakos gave the hosts hope with a header on 53 minutes, but the Seasiders held on for their third victory in seven Premier League outings.

After another international break, Blackpool played only their third home Premier League match of the season, against Manchester City. Carlos Tevez put the visitors ahead after 67 minutes. Marlon Harewood, on as substitute for Elliot Grandin, restored parity with his first goal at Bloomfield Road as a Blackpool player. Tevez put City ahead again after 79 minutes, before David Silva extended the lead in the final minute. Gary Taylor-Fletcher pulled one back three minutes into injury time, but Roberto Mancini's side held on for the three points.

On 23 October, Blackpool faced Birmingham City at St Andrew's. Liam Ridgewell put the Blues ahead after 34 minutes. A Charlie Adam error inside the visitors' six-yard box allowed Nikola Žigić to double their lead just before the hour mark, and that is how the score remained. It was Blackpool's fourth defeat in five Premier League games.

Blackpool obtained their fourth Premier League victory on 1 November with a 2–1 result against West Bromwich Albion at Bloomfield Road. It was their first home win of the campaign. The visitors were reduced to nine men inside half an hour. Charlie Adam, with his third league goal of the season, put Blackpool ahead from the penalty spot on twelve minutes. Luke Varney doubled the lead just after the hour mark, also his third of the campaign, before the Baggies scored what proved to be a consolation goal six minutes from time. The result moved Blackpool up to ninth in the table.

Everton were the visitors to Bloomfield Road on 6 November. Neal Eardley gave the Tangerines the lead with a free-kick on ten minutes. It was his first goal for the Seasiders since his move from Oldham Athletic at the start of the previous season. David Moyes' men hit back three minutes later with a header from Tim Cahill. Blackpool re-took the lead three minutes into the second half via David Vaughan, with his first goal of the season. The lead, once again, lasted only a few minutes. Séamus Coleman, making his first appearance against Blackpool since he helped the club to promotion during his loan spell the previous season, stroked the ball under the body of Matthew Gilks. It was his first League goal for the Toffees. With a point, Blackpool dropped two places to eleventh.

Four days later, Blackpool travelled to Villa Park to take on Aston Villa. Ian Holloway made ten changes to the team that faced Everton, with only Keith Southern retaining his place. Richard Kingson was given a debut in goal, and there was a rare start for club captain Jason Euell. Villa opened the scoring just before the half-hour through Stewart Downing. Marlon Harewood put Blackpool level in first-half injury time, his fourth of the Premier League campaign. Nathan Delfouneso restored Villa's lead on the hour mark, but three minutes from time, substitute DJ Campbell found the net for the first time in two months to level the score again. Two minutes later, however, James Collins scored what proved to be the winner. The defeat, their third in five games, saw Blackpool slip two places to fourteenth.

West Ham United were the opposition on 13 November. In front of a crowd of 31,000 at Upton Park, the two teams held out for a goalless draw, a result that dropped Blackpool a place in the table to fifteenth. Blackpool goalkeeper Matthew Gilks injured his patella during the match, and was replaced by Richard Kingson. Gilks subsequently missed much of the remainder of the season. After stirring-up controversy with his team selection in the previous match, Ian Holloway made eleven changes to the team that started against Aston Villa.

Seven days later, Wolverhampton Wanderers visited the seaside. In front of the watching Prince William, Luke Varney put the Tangerines ahead with a "spectacular" long-range volley. Marlon Harewood doubled their lead just before half-time. It was Harewood's fifth league goal of the season, and made him the club's top scorer. Kevin Doyle pulled one back for Wolves in the final minutes, but Blackpool held on for the victory. The three points moved the Seasiders up four places to eleventh.

November was closed out with a short trip to the Reebok Stadium to face Bolton Wanderers. Ian Evatt opened his account for the season with a header from Elliot Grandin's 28th-minute corner. Luke Varney doubled the visitors' lead twelve minutes into the second half with his fifth League goal of the season, which made him the club's joint-top scorer with Marlon Harewood. Martin Petrov volleyed home a reply for Bolton on 76 minutes. With one minute to go, Mark Davies completed the hosts' comeback. The match finished 2–2, a result that lifted Blackpool two places to tenth.

After a two-week break due to their scheduled home fixture against Manchester United being postponed due to a frozen Bloomfield Road pitch, Blackpool travelled to Stoke City on 11 December. DJ Campbell's third goal of the season on 48 minutes proved to be the winner. The result moved the visitors up to ninth in the table, but they dropped one place by the end of the day.

Their two subsequent home fixtures – against Tottenham Hotspur on 19 December and Liverpool seven days later – were postponed, the first due to unsafe conditions around the stadium and the second due to a frozen pitch. As a result, Blackpool slipped into the bottom half of the table.

On 28 December, after seventeen days without a game, Blackpool travelled to face Sunderland at the Stadium of Light, their first-ever visit to the ground and their first league fixture against Sunderland in 22 years. DJ Campbell opened the scoring five minutes into the second half. The forward, who was once signed to Birmingham by Sunderland manager Steve Bruce, doubled the visitors' lead in injury time with his fifth goal of the season, joining Marlon Harewood and Luke Varney at the top of the club's scoring chart. The Seasiders, who were without the suspended Charlie Adam, moved up three places to eighth with their victory, their fifth on the road.

Blackpool rang in the new year with a visit to the City of Manchester Stadium to face Manchester City, their first return fixture of the campaign. Adam Johnson put the hosts ahead on 34 minutes with a shot from the edge of the box that deflected off Stephen Crainey's leg. Less than a minute later, Luke Varney brought down Carlos Tevez in the area to give away a penalty; however, the Argentine put the ball wide of Richard Kingson's right-hand post to keep the score 1–0. City held on for the remainder of the game to complete their double over the Seasiders and inflict only Blackpool's second defeat in nine matches. Blackpool dropped two places to tenth after the result.

A second-successive defeat ensued three days later when Birmingham City visited Bloomfield Road for what was Blackpool's first home game in seven weeks. Alexander Hleb put City ahead after 24 minutes. DJ Campbell equalised 23 minutes into the second half, making himself the club's outright leading goalscorer for the campaign, before Scott Dann scored what proved to be the winner on 89 minutes. Blackpool remained eleventh in the table despite the reversal.

At the halfway stage of their Premier League season, Blackpool had played nineteen games, of which they had won seven, drawn four and lost eight, giving them 25 points. They had gained victories over Wigan Athletic (away), Newcastle United (away), Liverpool (away), West Bromwich Albion (home), Wolves (home), Stoke City (away) and Sunderland (away). Draws had occurred against Fulham (home), Everton (home), West Ham (away) and Bolton Wanderers (away). Their defeats came at the hands of Arsenal (away), Chelsea (away), Blackburn Rovers (home), Manchester City (home and away), Birmingham City (away and home) and Aston Villa (away).

Blackpool's FA Cup campaign ended where it started after a 2–0 defeat at Southampton on 8 January. Ian Holloway made nine changes to the team that started against Birmingham City – with only Neal Eardley and Matt Phillips retaining their places – as a weakened team was fielded for the third-round tie.

Premier League duty resumed on 12 January, with a midweek visit of Liverpool to Bloomfield Road, a rescheduled fixture after the previous month's postponement. It was returning Liverpool manager Kenny Dalglish's first League game in charge of the Anfield club. Fernando Torres put the visitors ahead on three minutes. Gary Taylor-Fletcher, a self-confessed Liverpool fan, equalised nine minutes later. DJ Campbell put the Seasiders ahead with a 69th-minute header, his fifth goal in five League games and seventh overall for the season, and it proved to be the game-winner. It completed Blackpool's first double over Liverpool since the 1946–47 campaign, shortly before the Reds won their fifth First Division championship, and it elevated them to ninth place in the table.

A defeat, at West Bromwich Albion, ensued on 15 January. David Vaughan opened the scoring on eleven minutes, with his second goal of the campaign. Peter Odemwingie equalised for the Baggies eight minutes before the break. James Morrison put the hosts ahead for the first time on 52 minutes, but Gary Taylor-Fletcher brought the Seasiders level, with his second goal in as many games, with ten minutes remaining. Odemwingie scored his second and West Brom's third with three minutes of normal time remaining, and Roberto Di Matteo's men held on for the three points. It was the tenth time this season that Blackpool have conceded a goal in the final ten minutes of a Premier League game. Seven of these occurrences saw them drop points by doing so.

On 21 January, Dekel Keinan left Bloomfield Road for Cardiff City after finding his chances with the Seasiders limited due to the pairing of Ian Evatt and Craig Cathcart in central defence.

The following day, Blackpool hosted Sunderland at Bloomfield Road. Kieran Richardson scored twice in the first half, before a second-half Charlie Adam penalty, to give the Wearsiders the three points. It was Blackpool's fourth Premier League defeat in five games and saw them drop one place to eleventh.

On 25 January, Manchester United visited Bloomfield Road for the first time since 1975 for a rescheduled fixture after their December postponement. Former United player Craig Cathcart put the Seasiders ahead with a 15th-minute header from a Charlie Adam corner. DJ Campbell doubled their lead two minutes before the break with his eighth goal of the campaign. Dimitar Berbatov, fresh off a hat-trick over Birmingham the previous weekend, pulled one back for Sir Alex Ferguson's side on 72 minutes. Javier Hernández levelled proceedings two minutes later, and Berbatov completed the comeback to score with two minutes of normal time remaining. Ten minutes of injury time were played, but United held on for a victory that put them five points clear at the top of the table. Blackpool, meanwhile, remained twelfth.

On 27 January 2011, the Premier League fined Blackpool £25,000 for fielding what they believed to be a weakened team against Aston Villa on 10 November. The club had fourteen days to appeal the decision, but decided not to, for fear of being docked points.

On the same day, after suffering six defeats in seven games, Ian Holloway brought in Moroccan defender Salaheddine Sbaï on loan from Nîmes until the end of the season, with an option to extend the deal for another year in the summer.

Four days later, on transfer-deadline day, Blackpool signed Andy Reid from Sunderland for an undisclosed fee until the end of the season. He was joined by loan signings James Beattie from Rangers, Jason Puncheon from Southampton, and Sergei Kornilenko from Zenit Saint Petersburg.

On 2 February, Blackpool hosted bottom club West Ham. Victor Obinna put Avram Grant's team ahead in the 24th minute. Robbie Keane, who joined the Hammers on loan from Tottenham two days earlier, doubled the visitors' lead after 36 minutes. Charlie Adam pulled one back with his first goal of the season from open play, but Obinna got his second and West Ham's third just before the break. It proved to be the final goal of the game. West Ham moved off the foot of the table, while Blackpool dropped one place to thirteenth.

Three days later, Blackpool travelled to Goodison Park to take on Everton. Louis Saha opened the scoring after nineteen minutes. Alex Baptiste, with his second goal of the campaign, levelled matters on 37. Two minutes after the break, Saha got his and the Toffees second. Jason Puncheon, on his full debut for the Seasiders, equalised just after the hour mark. Two minutes later, Charlie Adam put Blackpool ahead for the first time with a diving header after DJ Campbell's strike came back off the underside of the crossbar. Saha completed his hat-trick on 76 minutes to restore the balance. Jermaine Beckford put David Moyes' side ahead again in the 80th minute, before Saha scored his fourth and Everton's fifth to round out the scoring. Blackpool, with their fifth successive Premier League defeat and their eighth game of nine overall, dropped two places to 15th.

On 12 January, the Tangerines hosted Aston Villa. The visitors' Gabriel Agbonlahor opened the scoring in the tenth minute, but Elliot Grandin, with his first goal for Blackpool, equalised matters four minutes later. Grandin, however, limped off injured six minutes before the break. The match finished 1–1, stemming Blackpool's run of defeats, but they dropped one place to sixteenth, their lowest placing of the season to date.

Ten days later, Blackpool welcomed Tottenham Hotspur, conquerors of Milan the previous week, to the seaside for their fixture rescheduled from 19 December. Charlie Adam put the Seasiders ahead from the penalty spot on eighteen minutes after DJ Campbell was felled in the box. It was Adam's eighth overall goal of the campaign, his sixth from the spot. Campbell himself doubled the lead just before the break, volleying in James Beattie's cross from the right, for his ninth goal of the season. Substitute Brett Ormerod made it 3–0 ten minutes from time with his first League goal of the season. With that strike, Ormerod became the first Blackpool player to have scored in all four top divisions of English football. Roman Pavlyuchenko pulled one back for Harry Redknapp's men three minutes into injury time. Blackpool would have jumped five places to eleventh if they had kept the clean sheet, but instead had to settle for twelfth.

On 25 February, Marlon Harewood joined Barnsley on loan until the end of the season in a bid to get more playing time.

The following day, Blackpool travelled to bottom club Wolves. With Charlie Adam sitting out the first of two games due to suspension, having picked up ten disciplinary points, David Vaughan captained the Seasiders. Matthew Jarvis put Wanderers ahead inside two minutes. Blackpool were reduced to ten men when DJ Campbell was dismissed for violent conduct before half-time. Jamie O'Hara doubled Wolves' lead on 54 minutes, before a Sylvan Ebanks-Blake double rounded out the scoring. With their defeat, Blackpool dropped two places to fourteenth.

Nine days later, Chelsea, fresh off a victory over Manchester United less than a week earlier, visited Bloomfield Road. Former England captain John Terry opened the scoring for the visitors with a 20th-minute header. Frank Lampard doubled their lead with a penalty after Ian Evatt fouled Salomon Kalou in the box. Lampard got his and Chelsea's third four minutes later. Jason Puncheon pulled one back for Blackpool, who were without Charlie Adam, on 86 minutes. Richard Kingson left the field with a hamstring injury after Chelsea's second goal. He was replaced by Mark Halstead, who became the fourth goalkeeper used by Blackpool during the campaign. With their defeat, Blackpool remained fifteenth.

On 19 March, after an 11-day break, Blackpool travelled to Lancashire neighbours Blackburn Rovers. A first-half Charlie Adam double gave the visitors the half-time lead; however, strikes from Christopher Samba and, in injury time, Junior Hoilett, meant the honours were shared. Blackpool remained fifteenth, with eight League games remaining.

After a two-week break, due to FA Cup and international football, Blackpool travelled to London to face Fulham. A Bobby Zamora double inside half an hour, plus a second-half strike by Dickson Etuhu, condemned Ian Holloway's men to their eighth defeat in eleven Premier League games. They had dropped two places to 17th – one place and one point above the relegation zone – during their break, and they remained there with this defeat.

A second-successive Sunday afternoon fixture ensued against Arsenal at Bloomfield Road, the first of four home games in a row for Blackpool. Abou Diaby opened the scoring for the Gunners on 18 minutes. Emmanuel Eboué doubled the visitors' lead three minutes later. Gary Taylor-Fletcher brought the Tangerines back into the game seven minutes into the second half, but Robin van Persie sealed the points for Arsenal, who remained seven points behind leaders Manchester United. Blackpool, meanwhile, remained seventeenth.

On 16 April, Blackpool hosted Wigan Athletic. The home side conceded a goal inside three minutes, scored by Hugo Rodallega, after a wayward free-kick and subsequent slip by Craig Cathcart. Charles N'Zogbia doubled the lead in first-half injury time. Neal Eardley deflected in a third for the visitors, before DJ Campbell netted a consolation, his tenth goal of the League campaign. With the defeat, Blackpool dropped into the relegation zone for the first time.

A week later, Newcastle United visited Bloomfield Road, looking to avenge their defeat at St. James' Park earlier in the season. A wreath in memory of former Blackpool player and manager Allan Brown, who died earlier in the week, was laid behind the South Stand goal. Peter Løvenkrands put Alan Pardew's men ahead in the seventeenth minute. DJ Campbell equalised fifteen minutes later. The match finished 1–1. With the point, the Seasiders moved out of the relegation zone, on goal difference, at the expense of Wigan Athletic, who lost 4–2 at Sunderland.

On 30 April, Blackpool took on Stoke City at Bloomfield Road. A goalless draw ensued – the first clean sheet seen at the ground this season. Blackpool remained seventeenth, after Wigan Athletic drew at Everton.

Blackpool travelled to White Hart Lane on 7 May to face Tottenham Hotspur. The Seasiders had slipped into the relegation zone earlier in the day after Wigan Athletic drew with Aston Villa. Charlie Adam put the visitors ahead with a 76th-minute penalty, his eleventh goal of the season, less than a minute after missing from the spot. Jermain Defoe equalised in the final minute of normal time. With the draw, Blackpool edged out of the relegation zone again, but they dropped into it again the following day, when Wolves beat West Brom.

Seven days later, Blackpool played their final home fixture of the campaign. Bolton Wanderers were the visitors, and it was they who took the lead, in the sixth minute, via Kevin Davies. DJ Campbell equalised three minutes later, before Jason Puncheon put the hosts ahead just inside twenty minutes. Bolton pulled level five minutes later with a strike from Matthew Taylor. Just before the break, Campbell put Blackpool back in front with his second of the game and 13th of the campaign. On 63 minutes, Charlie Adam fired in his eleventh League goal for what proved to be the winner. It was a repeat scoreline of the 1953 "Matthews Final", and the late winger's first and last club, Stoke City, appeared in their first FA Cup Final, against Manchester City, later in the day. It was Blackpool's first victory for three months; however, they remained in the relegation zone after Wolves won 3–1 at Sunderland.

On 22 May, exactly 365 days since their Wembley promotion, Blackpool travelled to Old Trafford to face Manchester United, who were crowned champions a week earlier with their draw at Blackburn Rovers. In front of 75,000 fans, Park Ji-sung put the home side ahead after 21 minutes. Charlie Adam equalised with a free-kick just under 20 minutes later. It was the Scot's thirteenth goal of the campaign, in all competitions, making him the club's joint-top-scorer with DJ Campbell. Blackpool went ahead 12 minutes into the second half, via Gary Taylor-Fletcher. United pulled level on 74 minutes, when Ian Evatt sliced the ball into his own net. Substitute Michael Owen scored what proved to be the final goal of the game with nine minutes of normal time remaining. The result, combined with favourable results for Wolves and Wigan, meant Blackpool finished in nineteenth position and were relegated, by one point and three goals, back to The Championship. They were joined by West Ham, who were relegated the previous week, and Birmingham City.

At the end of the campaign, nine players were released. These were goalkeepers Paul Rachubka and Richard Kingson, defenders Danny Coid, Rob Edwards and David Carney, midfielders Malaury Martin, Ishmel Demontagnac and Jason Euell, and forward Marlon Harewood. On-loan Salaheddine Sbaï was not taken on permanently, while Andy Reid's season-long deal was not extended. Meanwhile, twelve-month options were activated on seven players: defenders Neal Eardley and Ian Evatt, midfielders Charlie Adam, Keith Southern and Gary Taylor-Fletcher, and forwards Billy Clarke and Louis Almond. Six players were offered new contracts. These were goalkeepers Matt Gilks and Mark Halstead, defenders Stephen Crainey and Ashley Eastham, midfielder David Vaughan, and forward Brett Ormerod. Ormerod accepted a one-year contract, but Vaughan turned down his offer, stating that he wanted to continue playing in the Premier League.

Transfers

In

Summer

January

Out

Summer

January

First-team squad
Squad at end of season

Left club during season

Reserve squad

Match results

Premier League

Final table

Results per matchday

League Cup

FA Cup

Player statistics

Appearances and goals

|-
! colspan=14 style=background:#dcdcdc; text-align:center| Goalkeepers

|-
! colspan=14 style=background:#dcdcdc; text-align:center| Defenders

|-
! colspan=14 style=background:#dcdcdc; text-align:center| Midfielders

|-
! colspan=14 style=background:#dcdcdc; text-align:center| Forwards

|-
! colspan=14 style=background:#dcdcdc; text-align:center| Players transferred out during the season

References
General
 Soccerbase

Specific

Blackpool F.C. seasons
Blackpool